Grey's Anatomy is an American medical drama television series that premiered on March 27, 2005, on ABC as a mid-season replacement. The series focuses on the lives of surgical interns, residents, and  attendings as they develop into seasoned doctors while balancing personal and professional relationships. The title is an allusion to Gray's Anatomy, a classic human anatomy textbook first published in 1858 in London and written by Henry Gray. Shonda Rhimes developed the pilot and continued to write for the series until 2015. Krista Vernoff, who previously worked with Rhimes, is now the showrunner. Rhimes was also one of the executive producers alongside Betsy Beers, Mark Gordon, Krista Vernoff, Rob Corn, Mark Wilding, Allan Heinberg, and Ellen Pompeo. Although the series is set in Seattle, Washington, it is filmed primarily in Los Angeles, California, and Vancouver, British Columbia.

The series revolves around Ellen Pompeo's character, Dr. Meredith Grey, until halfway through its 19th season, after which it shifts to a more ensemble format, with Pompeo only appearing in 8 episodes of season 19. Grey is first featured as an intern and later becomes the chief of general surgery while showcasing the complications of a surgeon's life. The original cast consisted of nine star-billed actors: Pompeo, Sandra Oh, Katherine Heigl, Justin Chambers, T. R. Knight, Chandra Wilson, James Pickens Jr., Isaiah Washington, and Patrick Dempsey. The cast has undergone major changes throughout the series' run. At the start of the 19th season, the show had a large ensemble of 17 actors—including three from the original cast (Pompeo, Wilson, and Pickens).

Grey's Anatomy is the longest-running scripted primetime show currently airing on ABC, and the longest scripted primetime series carried by ABC. Its success catapulted many longtime series regulars including Pompeo, Dempsey, and Oh to worldwide recognition; they were among the top five highest-earning television actors in 2013. While the show's ratings have fallen over the course of its run (it was once among the overall top-ten shows in the United States), it is still one of the highest-rated shows among the 18–49 demographic, and the #3 drama on all of broadcast television in the United States. The series was the highest revenue-earning show on television in terms of advertising in the 2007–08 season; in 2017, it was ranked tenth on the list. In its 15th season, Grey's Anatomy ranked as ABC's highest-rated drama. As of February 28, 2019, it was the longest-running American primetime medical drama series. The show now has a second spin-off series named Station 19, in addition to Private Practice. After the mid-season finale of the 19th season, Pompeo took to her Instagram to say farewell as she took a step back and announced that she would temporarily exit as a full-time character in the show (due to her doing a new Hulu show), but stated she would return as said full-time character after production finished.

Grey's Anatomy has been well received by critics throughout much of its run and has been included in various critics' year-end top 10 lists. Since its inception, the show has been described by the media outlets as a television "phenomenon" or a "juggernaut", owing to its longevity and dominant ratings. It is considered to have had a significant effect on popular culture and has received numerous awards, including the Golden Globe Award for Best Television Series – Drama and a total of 38 Primetime Emmy Award nominations, including two for Outstanding Drama Series. The cast members have also received accolades for their individual performances.

Plot 
The series follows the life of Meredith Grey (Ellen Pompeo), the daughter of the famous general surgeon Ellis Grey (Kate Burton), starting from her acceptance into the surgical residency program at the fictional Seattle Grace Hospital (later named Seattle Grace Mercy West and finally, Grey Sloan Memorial Hospital). During her time as an intern, Grey works alongside fellow physicians Cristina Yang (Sandra Oh), Izzie Stevens (Katherine Heigl), Alex Karev (Justin Chambers) and George O'Malley (T. R. Knight), who each struggle to balance their personal lives with hectic schedules and stressful residency requirements. During their internship, they are overseen by Miranda Bailey (Chandra Wilson), a senior resident, who works with attending physicians Derek Shepherd (Patrick Dempsey), head of neurosurgery and Meredith's love interest, and Preston Burke (Isaiah Washington), head of cardiothoracic surgery, who becomes Yang's fiancé. Richard Webber (James Pickens Jr.), Chief of Surgery and attending general surgeon, is the former lover of Ellis Grey. During the first 6 seasons, Burke, O'Malley, and Stevens all depart the series.

The series also shows drama and emotions focused on Meredith's life. In addition to Webber, Burke, and Shepherd, the surgical wing is primarily supervised by Addison Montgomery (Kate Walsh), Shepherd's ex-wife and the head of OB/GYN, neonatal and fetal surgery who leaves for Los Angeles at the end of season 3; Mark Sloan (Eric Dane), head of plastic surgery; Callie Torres (Sara Ramirez), a resident who later becomes head of orthopedic surgery and leaves Seattle for New York at the end of the 12th season; Erica Hahn (Brooke Smith), as head of cardiothoracic surgery, who leaves Seattle Grace in season 5 after a disagreement with Torres, with whom she shared a brief relationship; Owen Hunt (Kevin McKidd), as head of trauma who later marries and divorces Yang; Arizona Robbins (Jessica Capshaw), as head of pediatric surgery, and later head of maternal / fetal surgery who marries Torres; Teddy Altman (Kim Raver), as head of cardiothoracic surgery who departs at the end of season 8 but returns in season 14; and Amelia Shepherd (Caterina Scorsone), Derek's sister, who is hired to replace him as head of neurosurgery.

Lexie Grey (Chyler Leigh), Meredith's paternal half-sister, joins the residency program in season 4 until her death with her love-interest Mark Sloan in the plane crash at the end of season 8, after which Seattle Grace is renamed Grey Sloan Memorial Hospital in their memory. Former Mercy-West residents April Kepner (Sarah Drew) and Jackson Avery (Jesse Williams) join Seattle Grace following an administrative merger in season 6. Other additions include Leah Murphy (Tessa Ferrer), who departs at the end of season 10 but returns during season 13; Shane Ross (Gaius Charles), who leaves with Yang for Zurich, Switzerland, in the season 10 finale; Stephanie Edwards (Jerrika Hinton), who resigns at the end of season 13; Jo Wilson (Camilla Luddington), who marries Karev; Andrew DeLuca (Giacomo Gianniotti), the former love interest of Meredith's maternal half sister Maggie Pierce (Kelly McCreary) who also serves as head of cardiothoracic surgery; and Ben Warren (Jason George), an anesthesiologist turned resident turned firefighter who marries Bailey. Season 11 sees the death of Derek Shepherd, and in season 12, attending cardiovascular surgeon Nathan Riggs (Martin Henderson) joins the show. In the early episodes of season 14, Thomas Koracick (Greg Germann), an attending neurosurgeon, begins making appearances and Riggs leaves the series to start a life with Owen's long-lost sister Megan (Abigail Spencer); by the season finale, Robbins, Kepner and Warren also depart the show. Midway through the 16th season, Cormac Hayes (Richard Flood) becomes the new Chief of Pediatric Surgery and Karev made his final appearance on the series. During the 17th season, DeLuca is stabbed while chasing a child abductor and despite the efforts of Hunt and Altman, he dies. Avery and Koracick also depart in season 17, with Avery moving to Boston to take over his family's Foundation and Koracick leaving to assist him. In Season 18, Hayes moves back to his home country, Hunt and Altman flee the country, Marsh returns to Minnesota, Webber and Fox go on sabbatical, and Bailey resigns as chief of surgery, leaving Grey as chief of surgery of Grey-Sloan Memorial.

Series synopsis

Greys Anatomy follows the lives of surgical interns, residents, and attendings at the fictional Grey-Sloan Memorial Hospital (formerly Seattle Grace Hospital, Season 1–6, Seattle Grace Mercy West Hospital, Season 6–9, and then Grey-Sloan Memorial Hospital, Season 9–present), as the interns gradually develop into seasoned doctors through the mentoring of their residents, attendings, and chiefs of surgery. Each installment typically begins with a voice-over narrative from Meredith Grey or a season regular, foreshadowing the theme of the episode. Each season tends to represent the physicians' academic year, with each completed year qualifying the residents at a level higher in the surgical field. The season typically ends with a dramatic event such as a death or character departure. Most installments revolve around the doctors' everyday lives as surgeons, but the show also emphasizes their personal, as well as their professional, lives. The series often sets aside medical ethics concerns in order to foreground character development and relationships. While the physicians treat the illnesses of their patients, often through complex surgeries, they also display a competitive spirit and seek praise.

After arriving at the hospital each morning, residents may argue over who gets the challenge of a certain patient who has arrived that day. A hospital superior assigns cases, often generating tension between the residents and their superiors. Within each episode, there are shifts from the doctors interacting with their patients, to scenes with their co-workers. Once assigned a case, each doctor diagnoses the patient, with the help of his or her attending physician, which usually leads to surgery. The surgeons tend to form personal connections with their patients, with a patient often conveying a message to his or her doctor, which unintentionally relates to the doctor's private life. The show displays the growth of relationships between the doctors, either friendly or romantic, which may produce conflicts between their personal and professional lives. Emotional scenes are often accompanied by an indie rock background song, something that has become a hallmark of the series. At the conclusion of each episode, one of the characters delivers another voiceover, typically contrasting or following up on the initial one.

Cast, characters, and appearance period

Cast table

Main cast 
The five characters who are first introduced in the series premiere as surgical interns, are Meredith Grey, Cristina Yang, Izzie Stevens, Alex Karev, and George O'Malley. They are initially mentored by Dr. Miranda Bailey, a senior resident who becomes the hospital's Chief Resident, and later an attending general surgeon, in season 6. The surgical program is initially headed by Richard Webber, the Chief of Surgery, who has a pre-existing personal relationship with Meredith, having had an affair with her mother when Meredith was a child. In Webber's employ are attending neurosurgeon Derek Shepherd, dubbed 'McDreamy' by the residents, and attending cardiothoracic surgeon Preston Burke. Shepherd is introduced as Meredith's love-interest, while Burke begins a relationship with Yang.

Introduced in the show's second season are obstetrician-gynecologist and neonatal surgeon, Addison Montgomery, plastic surgeon Mark Sloan (nicknamed 'McSteamy' by the interns), from New York, and orthopedic surgeon Callie Torres. Montgomery is Shepherd's estranged wife who arrives in Seattle seeking reconciliation with him, Sloan is Shepherd's former best-friend, who aided the breakdown of his marriage by having an affair with Montgomery, while Torres is introduced as a love-interest, and eventual wife for O'Malley. The penultimate episode of season 3 introduces Lexie Grey, Meredith's half-sister who unexpectedly decides to pursue her internship at Seattle Grace Hospital after her mother's sudden death, and begins an on-again, off-again relationship with Sloan. Burke and Yang, having been engaged, endeavor to plan their wedding, while Montgomery departs the show in the season 3 finale, relocating to California, seeking a new life. The season three finale also shows Burke's exit from the show, after leaving Yang at the altar on their wedding day.

Grey, Yang, Stevens, and Karev are all promoted to residents in the season 4 premiere, while O'Malley is forced to repeat his internship year, following his failing of the intern exam. Subsequently, Torres and O'Malley divorce one another, due to him having an affair with Stevens, initially concealing it from Torres. Early in the fourth season, cardiothoracic surgeon Erica Hahn becomes Torres's love-interest. During the fifth season, Hahn departs from the series after a disagreement with Torres, and O'Malley retakes his intern exam, passes and joins his fellow physicians as a resident. 2 new characters are introduced, former United States Army trauma surgeon Dr. Owen Hunt, and pediatric surgeon Dr. Arizona Robbins. Hunt becomes a love-interest for Yang, while Robbins begins a relationship with Torres. When Stevens is diagnosed with stage IV metastatic melanoma, she and Karev get married at the conclusion of the fifth season. In addition, Meredith and Shepherd marry, with their vows written on a blue post-it note.

O'Malley dies in the premiere of the sixth season, due to injuries sustained from saving a woman from being hit by a bus, and Stevens later departs Seattle following a communication breakdown with her then-husband Karev following the Seattle Grace merger with Mercy West Hospital. Several new characters are introduced as Seattle Grace Hospital merges with Mercy West Hospital. Residents April Kepner, Jackson Avery, Reed Adamson, and Charles Percy, all transfer to Seattle Grace Hospital from Mercy West Hospital, and Avery has a brief relationship with Lexie, until she reunites with Sloan. Subsequently, Teddy Altman is introduced as the new Chief of Cardiothoracic Surgery. In the season 6 finale, a deceased patient's grieving husband embarks on a shooting spree at the hospital, injuring Karev, Shepherd, and Hunt, and killing residents Adamson and Percy. In the shooting's emotional reverberations, Yang and Hunt abruptly marry, not wanting to risk separation. Torres and Robbins eventually wed, officiated by Bailey. In season eight, Webber steps down as Chief of Surgery and allocates his job to Hunt. As the final year of residency for Meredith, Yang, Karev, Kepner and Avery is coming to a close, the doctors are all planning to relocate to different hospitals to pursue their specialty careers. However, all plans are put on hold when several doctors from Seattle Grace Mercy West Hospital are engaged in a plane crash, which kills Lexie and endangers Meredith, Shepherd, Yang, Sloan and Robbins. At the conclusion of the eighth season, Altman is courteously fired by Hunt as she struggles to decide whether or not to take the job as Chief at the United States Army Medical Command (MEDCOM).

In the season 9 premiere, Sloan dies due to sustained injuries from the plane crash following a brief relapse of temporary health ("the surge") and the remaining characters work through their post traumatic stress and Arizona Robbins's loss of limb by way of suing Seattle Grace Mercy West, as the hospital was responsible for putting the surgeons on the plane. The season continues with the struggle of the lawsuit and the animosity that it creates within the hospital, Yang and Hunt eventually divorce in order to help the lawsuit. The doctors who were on the plane win the lawsuit, but the payout bankrupts the hospital. They all club together and buy Seattle Grace Mercy West, with the help of the Harper Avery Foundation, and they become the Board of Directors, once being called the "Grey-Sloan 7". One of the changes they implement is renaming the hospital to Grey Sloan Memorial Hospital in memory of Lexie Grey and Mark Sloan. Robbins cheats on Torres with a visiting facial reconstruction surgeon and Webber gets electrocuted in the season 9 finale. Grey's Anatomy saw the departure of one of its major players, Cristina Yang, played by Sandra Oh in the season 10 finale. The 11th season also saw the introduction of the new Chief of Cardiothoracic Surgery, Maggie Pierce, Richard's secret daughter with Ellis Grey. Towards the end of the 11th season, Derek Shepherd witnesses a car accident and pulls over to help the injured, but his car is hit by a truck with him inside as he attempts to leave the scene. He later dies at another hospital following the doctors' mishandling of his injuries. The season 12 finale saw the departure of one of the show's longest-running characters, Callie Torres, played by Sara Ramirez. Altman returns to Seattle at the beginning of the 14th season while Robbins and Kepner depart in the season finale to pursue other career opportunities. Season 16 was the last to feature Alex Karev, who moved to Kansas to reunite with Stevens, leaving Grey as the last remaining intern from the original cast. Season 17 saw the departure of Andrew DeLuca, after he was stabbed and ultimately died after pursuing the sex trafficker Opal, and was also the last season to feature both Jackson Avery, who moved to Boston in order to run a family foundation and Tom Koracick, who also moved to Boston to assist Avery, as main characters. Cormac Hayes departed the series in its 18th season after deciding to return to Ireland with his kids.

The Grey's Anatomy (season 18) finale showed Altman and Hunt, with their children, on the run to leave the country for being police fugitives. Bailey knew what Hunt and Altman did, and told them she had to call the police, but gave them enough time to flee. The residency program in Grey Sloan was also cancelled due to lack of doctors. Throughout the season, Meredith was traveling to a hospital in Minnesota, and she ultimately made a decision to take a job in the hospital where she was working, which almost ended her career at Grey Sloan. Grey, at the time, had a new love interest Dr. Nick Marsh (Scott Speedman), who was a doctor at Mayo Clinic where Meredith's new job opportunity was. In the very end of season 18, Bailey resigned as chief of surgery and made Meredith Grey take over as interim chief, leaving Grey in a state of shock.

Recurring
With the drama's setting being a hospital, numerous medical personnel appear regularly on the show, as well as several other recurring characters. Joe (Steven W. Bailey), is first shown as the owner of the Emerald City Bar and Grill, across the street from the hospital, which is a common relaxation area for the physicians. Also introduced in the pilot, is the legendary former general surgeon, Dr. Ellis Grey (Kate Burton), Meredith's Alzheimer's-stricken mother, who appeared on the show until her death in season 3. In the first season, Olivia Harper (Sarah Utterback), a nurse who appeared on the show occasionally until getting laid off in the merger with Mercy West, engages in a sexual relationship with O'Malley, giving him syphilis. Serving as an assistant and secretary to the Chief of Surgery, former nurse Patricia (Robin Pearson Rose), has appeared on the show since its debut. Tyler Christian (Moe Irvin), a hospital nurse, makes occasional appearances throughout the series. Within the second season, Bailey becomes pregnant by her husband, Tucker Jones (Cress Williams), who makes frequent appearances on Grey's Anatomy, until their divorce in season 5. While Bailey takes a sabbatical, due to her pregnancy, the cheerful Dr. Sydney Heron (Kali Rocha), fills her position as the resident supervising Grey, Yang, Stevens, Karev and O'Malley, and makes occasional appearances until the fifth season.

Thatcher and Susan Grey (Jeff Perry and Mare Winningham), Meredith's estranged father and step-mother, are introduced in season 2, with Susan making appearances until her death in season 3, and Thatcher continuing to appear in the series until his death in season 15. Adele Webber (Loretta Devine), is introduced as Richard's wife, who eventually acquires Alzheimer's, in the seventh season, and continued to make appearances until her death in season 9. Introduced as Preston's mother, Jane Burke (Diahann Carroll) makes occasional appearances until the fourth season. Denny Duquette (Jeffrey Dean Morgan), a patient with congestive heart failure, originates as one of Burke's patients, who goes on to propose to Stevens, after weeks of bonding between the two. Facing death, Stevens cuts Duquette's left ventricular assist device (LVAD), to elevate his position on the United Network for Organ Sharing (UNOS) transplant list. This ultimately ends in his death season 2 finale, marking his initial departure from the show, and placing Stevens on disciplinary probation. Initially conceived as a veterinarian hired for Shepherd's dog, Doc, Dr. Finn Dandridge (Chris O'Donnell) soon becomes a love-interest for Meredith, while Shepherd is with Montgomery. Dandridge is included in a multi-episode story arc in seasons 2 and 3, consisting of 9 episodes, ending when Meredith reunites with Shepherd.

In season 3, George's father, Harold O'Malley (George Dzundza), is diagnosed with cancer and dies, with his wife Louise (Debra Monk) and George's brothers Jerry (Greg Pitts) and Ronny (Tim Griffin) by his side. Louise goes on to appear occasionally, and was last seen in season 8. A ferryboat accident brings along Rebecca Pope (Elizabeth Reaser), who is initially introduced as a pregnant amnesiac Jane Doe patient. Pope eventually embarks on a relationship with Karev, until she is diagnosed with a personality disorder in season 4, and makes her final departure. Amidst the crisis of the ferryboat crash, Meredith falls into the water at the disaster site. Although rescued, she goes into cardiac arrest, waking up in what appears to be limbo. Within the limbo, Meredith is entertained by deceased acquaintances Duquette and Dylan Young (Kyle Chandler), who was killed during a bomb crisis in the second season, until eventually being resuscitated. Seeking a cure to her depression, Meredith undergoes therapy sessions with the hospital psychiatrist, Dr. Katharine Wyatt (Amy Madigan), who in addition, serves as a psychiatrist to Hunt.

The season 4 premiere introduces several new interns, to be trained under Meredith, Yang, Stevens, Karev, and eventually O'Malley. Among them are Dr. Steve Mostow (Mark Saul) who continues to make appearances, and Dr. Sadie Harris (Melissa George) who formed a friendship with Meredith while the two were in college. Harris is fired in the fifth season, due to not actually having a medical degree, and departs the show immediately after. Meredith and Shepherd's relationship reaches a crisis, and the two separate, leaving Shepherd to entertain a relationship with Rose (Lauren Stamile), a nurse. Rose appears frequently until season 5, when Derek and Meredith decide to rekindle their flame. Throughout the fifth season, Stevens experiences full-out hallucinations of Duquette, signaling that she is ill, and once she is lucid, he departs, marking his final appearance. Following the announcement of her relationship with Robbins (Jessica Capshaw), Callie's father Carlos Torres (Hector Elizondo) initially contests his daughter's concurrence in homosexuality, but eventually accepts it, and he reappears several times throughout the series.

The hospital's merging with Mercy West introduces new residents: Dr. Reed Adamson (Nora Zehetner) and Dr. Charles Percy (Robert Baker), but the two are both murdered in the season 6 finale. Also introduced in the sixth season is Dr. Ben Warren (Jason George), an anesthesiologist and eventual husband to Dr. Miranda Bailey, as well as Sloan Riley (Leven Rambin), Dr. Mark Sloan's estranged pregnant daughter who seeks kinship with him. Robbins receives a grant to aid children in Malawi, which leads to a falling-out between her and Torres. While in Malawi, Robbins is replaced by Dr. Robert Stark (Peter MacNicol), a pediatric surgeon with an interest in Dr. April Kepner, who appears occasionally until season 8. Following the breakdown of Dr. Torres's relationship with Dr. Robbins, Dr. Torres becomes pregnant with Dr. Sloan's baby. Torres's relationship with Robbins is subsequently mended, and the couple endeavors to raise their new daughter, Sofia Robbin Sloan Torres, with the help of Dr. Sloan. Dr. Lucy Fields (Rachael Taylor), an obstetrician-gynecologist, is introduced in the seventh season, and serves as a love-interest for Dr. Alex Karev, until eventually taking up Robbins' job in Africa. Shepherd and Meredith also become new parents, with their adoption of Zola, a baby girl from Malawi. Conceived as a patient with a tumor condition who later develops diabetes, Henry Burton (Scott Foley) befriends Dr. Altman and eventually joins her in marriage only to get treated using her medical insurance, until he dies while undergoing heart surgery in season 8.

In the season 9 premiere, interns Dr. Jo Wilson (Camilla Luddington), Dr. Shane Ross (Gaius Charles), Dr. Stephanie Edwards (Jerrika Hinton), Dr. Leah Murphy (Tessa Ferrer) and Dr. Heather Brooks (Tina Majorino) are introduced. Steven Culp and William Daniels play Dr. Parker and Dr. Craig Thomas, respectively. Dr. Parker is Chief of Cardiothoracic Surgery and Dr. Craig Thomas (William Daniels) is an attending cardiothoracic surgeon at Mayo Clinic, where Cristina worked temporarily. Dr. Alana Cahill (Constance Zimmer) introduced in season 9 is appointed to cut costs at the hospital and she eventually decides the best course of action would be to seek out a new buyer until the 4 crash survivors and Torres on the behalf of Sloan pool their money together in a bid to purchase the hospital themselves. Kepner starts dating a paramedic named Matthew Taylor (Justin Bruening) and they form a deep relationship over the course of seasons 9 and 10 and she eventually agreed to marry before reconciling with Avery in the middle of her wedding ceremony to Matthew. Lauren Boswell (Hilarie Burton) is introduced as a craniofacial surgeon consulting on a case at Grey Sloan Memorial who showed romantic interest in Arizona and eventually ended up having a one-night stand with her.

Dr. Heather Brooks dies in the premiere of season 10. She goes to search for Dr. Webber and finds him lying in the basement of the hospital. Trying to save Dr. Webber, she accidentally steps into a puddle and electrocutes herself while hitting her head as she falls. Also introduced in season 10 was Dr. Karev's estranged father Jimmy Evans (James Remar) who tries to form a relationship with his son but fails repeatedly, and dies in a botched surgery. The conclusion of season 10 has Cristina leaving Grey Sloan for Dr. Burke's job as head of Klausman Institute for Medical Research in Zurich, while Dr. Ross makes a last-minute decision to follow her in order to study under her. Dr. Maggie Pierce (Kelly McCreary) unknowingly drops a bombshell that she is the child of Dr. Webber and the late Dr. Grey, and was given up at birth for adoption. Dr. Meredith Grey has to accommodate another half-sister in her life. Also, Dr. Yang privately gives her shares in the hospital to Dr. Karev, also giving him her seat on the board. But Dr. Webber all but promises the seat to Dr. Bailey, so the board has to decide between them. Season 11 begins with new surgical residents coming to the hospital. Introduced in season 11 is Dr. Nicole Herman (Geena Davis), who is Chief of Fetal Surgery at Grey Sloan Memorial. Dr. Herman selects Robbins for a fetal surgery fellowship and becomes her mentor. Herman features in a 12-episode arc before departing in episode 14.

Production and development

Conception
Shonda Rhimes wanted to make a show that she would enjoy watching, and thought it would be interesting to create a show about "smart women competing against one another".

When asked how she decided to develop a medical drama, Rhimes responded: 

The series was pitched to ABC Entertainment, who gave the green light. The show was picked up as a mid-season replacement for Boston Legal in the 2005 television season. Francie Calfo, executive vice president of development at ABC Entertainment, commented that ABC was looking for a medical show that was unlike the others airing at the time. She pointed out: 

While creating characters, as well as writing the first script, the series' writers had no character descriptions in mind, and hoped to cast the best actor available for each part. Rhimes has said that if the network had not allowed her to create characters this way, she would have been hesitant about moving forward with the series. Female roles, in particular, were developed as multi-faceted characters.

Rhimes offered her insight: 

The show's title, Grey's Anatomy, was devised as a play on words: a reference to both Henry Gray's classic English medical textbook, Gray's Anatomy (first published in 1858 and still in print), and the title character Dr. Meredith Grey (Ellen Pompeo). Before the series debuted on March 27, 2005, a few early releases were shown to close friends and family of the producers and actors. The show was scheduled to run in the Boston Legal time slot for 4 weeks.

The show's high ratings and viewership resulted in ABC keeping it in that slot for the remainder of the season. ABC Entertainment President, Steve McPherson, commented on the scheduling change: "Ultimately we decided that, without having adequate lead time or marketing dollars to devote to moving either show so late in the season, we'd continue to let [Grey's Anatomy] build on its tremendous momentum through May." Prior to broadcast, it was announced that the show's title would be changed from Grey's Anatomy to Complications, although this did not take place.

Production team
Grey's Anatomy is produced by ShondaLand, in association with The Mark Gordon Company, and ABC Studios (formerly Touchstone Television). Rhimes, Betsy Beers, Krista Vernoff, Mark Gordon, Rob Corn, and Mark Wilding have all served as executive producers throughout the course of the series. In subsequent seasons, Steve Mulholland, Kent Hodder, Nancy Bordson, James D. Parriott, and Peter Horton have also been executive producers, with Allan Heinberg joining the show in 2006 in this role. As of season eight, the executive producers were Rhimes, Beers, Gordon, Vernoff, Corn, Wilding, and Heinberg.

Rhimes is the series head writer, or its most prolific writer. She often promotes the show by answering fan questions on her Twitter account. Other members of the writing staff are Vernoff, Wilding, Peter Nowalk, Stacy McKee, William Harper, Zoanne Clack, Tony Phelan, Joan Rater, and Debora Cahn. From the second through seventh seasons, the writers maintained a blog entitled Grey Matter, where the writer of an episode discussed background of the writing. 

Directors vary by episode, with Rob Corn directing most frequently, followed by Tom Verica. Horton, Edward Ornelas, and Jessica Yu have also directed a substantial number of episodes. Cast members Chandra Wilson, Debbie Allen, and Kevin McKidd have each directed multiple episodes.

Grey's Anatomy has been edited by Susan Vaill since the show's inception, and David Greenspan was named an editor in 2006. Casting directors Linda Lowy and John Brace have been a part of the production team since 2005. The production design is led by Donald Lee Harris, assisted by art director Brian Harms, and costume design is led by Mimi Melgaard. Working alongside Melgaard, Thomas Houchins supervises costumes, Ellen Vieira is the makeup artist, and Jerilynn Stevens serves as a hairstylist. The Director of Photography is Herbert Davis. The music coordinator is Danny Lux.
Karen Lisa Pike, M.D. is the on-set medical consultant, alongside Linda Klein, an RN. In an interview, Ellen Pompeo (Meredith Grey) stated "We always ask Linda, you know, what is this procedure, what is this surgery, when is this performed, what happens"- various members of the cast spoke of the importance of having real surgeons around especially in learning how to properly hold instruments, how to accurately use medical language and develop their characters in an authentic way; most of the cast members observed real surgery in real life as preparation for their roles. The production staff is part of a Grey's Anatomy softball team that competes against other television shows, such as CSI: Crime Scene Investigation.

Casting

Grey's Anatomy used a color-blind casting technique, resulting in a racially diverse ensemble. Each role was cast without the character's race being pre-determined, keeping Rhimes's vision of diversity. The production staff began casting with the program's title character, Dr. Meredith Grey, which Rhimes said was a challenging role to cast. "I kept saying we need a girl like that girl from Moonlight Mile (2002)," said Rhimes, "and after a while, they were like, 'We think we can get that girl from Moonlight Mile." The next to be cast, Sandra Oh (Dr. Cristina Yang), was initially invited to audition for the character of Bailey, but pressed to read for the role of Cristina instead. Many actors read for the role of Dr. Derek Shepherd. Rob Lowe was offered the role, but turned it down as he had already agreed to star in another medical drama Dr. Vegas. When Patrick Dempsey read for the part, "he was just perfect," according to Rhimes.

The only character developed with a racial description in mind was Dr. Miranda Bailey, who is portrayed by Chandra Wilson. Her character was first described as a tiny blonde with curly hair, but when Wilson began speaking, Rhimes reported: "[Wilson] is exactly who Miranda is." James Pickens Jr. was selected to appear as Dr. Richard Webber in the series' pilot and first season. Katherine Heigl wanted to portray Dr. Izzie Stevens as a brunette but was requested to retain her natural blonde for the part. Isaiah Washington, who portrayed Dr. Preston Burke, initially read for the role of Shepherd but was cast as Burke, because the original actor to play Burke had to withdraw. T. R. Knight signed on for the pilot as Dr. George O'Malley, expecting that the role might be short-lived, because he liked that the character was multi-faceted. Rounding out the season 1 cast was Justin Chambers as Dr. Alex Karev, a character who was not originally included in the show's pilot, but added through digital editing and additional scenes.

Season 2 marked the introduction of attending doctors Mark Sloan (Eric Dane) and Callie Torres (Sara Ramirez). They were initially cast as recurring characters, but both were given star billing at the opening of season 3. Ramirez was cast after ABC executives offered them a role in the network show of their choice; Dane had previously auditioned unsuccessfully for a role in the pilot episode. Dr. Addison Montgomery (Kate Walsh) also joined the show in season 2, after making a guest appearance in the season 1 finale

In October 2006, Washington allegedly insulted Knight with a homophobic slur, during an on-set altercation with Dempsey, and ABC terminated Washington's contract at the end of season 3. Washington returned for a guest appearance in season 10. At the conclusion of season 3, Walsh departed the show to pursue the Grey's Anatomy spin-off, Private Practice, but continues to make guest appearances.

Chyler Leigh joined the cast as a main character in season 4 as Dr. Lexie Grey, Meredith's half-sister. Leigh had appeared as a guest-star in the final 2 episodes of season 3. On the selection of Leigh for the role of Lexie, Rhimes said: "Chyler stood out ... It felt like she could be Meredith's sister, but she had a depth that was very interesting."

Dr. Erica Hahn (Brooke Smith), who first appeared on Grey's Anatomy in season 2, returned as a series regular in season 4. Shortly after the announcement that Smith would be a regular member of the cast, Entertainment Weekly Michael Ausiello, reported that her character, Hahn, would depart from Grey's Anatomy on November 6, 2008. E! Online Kristin Dos Santos asserted that Smith's dismissal from the show had been forced by the ABC network, as part of an attempt to "de-gay" Grey's Anatomy. Rhimes countered these claims, saying that "we did not find that the magic and chemistry with Brooke's character would sustain in the long run".

Season 5 introduced actor Kevin McKidd (Dr. Owen Hunt), who was signed as a series regular after originally being cast for a specific story-arc. In addition, Jessica Capshaw (Dr. Arizona Robbins) was originally introduced for a 3-episode arc, but her contract was extended until the end of the season; she became a series regular in the sixth season.

Knight departed the show at the conclusion of season 5, citing an unhappiness with the development and lack of screen-time for his character. Directly following Knight's departure, Entertainment Weekly reported that Heigl had not returned to the set as scheduled after her maternity leave. It was later confirmed that Heigl would not return to the show at all.

Kim Raver, who was cast as recurring character Dr. Teddy Altman in season 6, was given star billing later in the season. Sarah Drew (Dr. April Kepner) and Jesse Williams (Dr. Jackson Avery), who both made their series debuts as recurring characters in the sixth season, and received star-billing in the seventh.

The 6 original actors' contracts expired after season 8, but in May 2012, Pompeo, Oh, Chambers, Wilson, Pickens Jr. and Dempsey renewed their contracts with the show for another 2 years. At the conclusion of season 8, Leigh's character Lexie Grey departed from the show at Leigh's request, and with Rhimes's agreement. Raver's character Teddy Altman was also written out of the show during the season 8 finale. Rhimes said that Raver had been offered a contract renewal, but declined.

In July 2012, Dane (Sloan) confirmed that he was departing the show to pursue other projects; he made his final appearances in the first 2 episodes of season 9. With the start of season 10, Camilla Luddington, Gaius Charles, Jerrika Hinton and Tessa Ferrer were introduced to the show as series regulars. They were first introduced to the show in season 9 as the new interns. On August 13, 2013, Oh (Cristina) announced that the show's tenth season would be her final one. In March 2014, it was announced that Isaiah Washington, who portrayed Preston Burke in the first 3 seasons of the show, would make a guest appearance to coincide with the departure of series regular Sandra Oh, his former on-screen love-interest. Neither Charles's nor Ferrer's contracts were renewed for season 11.

On May 2, 2014, it was announced that, in addition to Pompeo and Dempsey, all the original remaining cast members—apart from Oh—signed 2-year deals, extending their contracts through seasons 11 and 12. Despite joining the series in season 2, Sara Ramirez was on the same negotiation schedule as the season 1 cast and also signed a new 2-year deal. On April 23, 2015, Dempsey departed the show during the show's 11th season, despite the fact that he still had a year left in his contract. On the night of the season 12 finale, May 19, 2016, Sara Ramirez announced that they would be leaving the show following the decision to not renew their contract.

On January 17, 2018, it was announced by ABC that Ellen Pompeo's contract had been renewed through season 16. Not only did the contract renewal insure that Pompeo will return as Meredith Grey, but it made her a producer of Grey's Anatomy and a co-executive producer of Station 19. The deal made Pompeo the highest-paid actress currently on a dramatic TV series, with her making $575,000 per episode and over $20 million yearly. On March 8, 2018, it was announced that series regulars Jessica Capshaw and Sarah Drew would not be returning for season 15 after executive producers decided to let them go. In May 2018, it was confirmed that Kim Raver, who made returning guest appearances in season 14, would once again become a series regular, beginning with season 15. In January 2020, Justin Chambers announced that he had departed the series and that his final episode had aired on November 14, 2019. In March 2021, Giacomo Gianniotti departed the series after wanting to pursue new things such as directing. In May 2021, Jesse Williams and Greg Germann both left the main cast, although Germann is expected to remain on the show in a guest capacity. In September 2021, it was announced that Kate Walsh would be returning as Addison Montgomery for multiple episodes in season 18. In July 2022, it was announced that Alexis Floyd, Niko Terho, Adelaide Kane, Midori Francis and Harry Shum Jr. joined the cast as series regular for the nineteenth season. In August 2022, it was announced that Ellen Pompeo will appear in only eight episodes of the upcoming nineteenth season having her role reduce, because she is set to star in Hulu’s Orphan limited series, but she will continue to narrate the episodes and will remain an executive producer.

Filming locations and techniques

Rhimes considered setting the medical drama in her hometown, Chicago, but eventually decided to go with Seattle, to distinguish Grey's Anatomy from the Chicago-based series ER.

Fisher Plaza, which is the headquarters building of the former Fisher Communications (since merged into Sinclair Broadcasting Group) and SBG's ABC-affiliated KOMO radio and television stations in Seattle, is used for some exterior shots of Grey-Sloan Memorial Hospital. In particular, air ambulances land on the KOMO-TV news copter's helipad. This suggests the hospital is close to the Space Needle (which is directly across the street from Fisher Plaza), the Seattle Monorail, and other local landmarks.

However, the hospital used for most other exterior and a few interior shots is not in Seattle; these scenes are shot at the VA Sepulveda Ambulatory Care Center in North Hills, California, and occasional shots from an interior walkway above the lobby show dry California mountains in the distance. The exterior of Meredith Grey's house, also known as the Intern House, is real. In the show, the address of Grey's home is 613 Harper Lane, but this is not an actual address. The physical house is located at 303 W. Comstock St., on Queen Anne, Seattle, Washington. Most scenes are taped at The Prospect Studios in Los Feliz, just east of Hollywood, where the Grey's Anatomy set occupies 6 sound stages. Some outside scenes are filmed at the Warren G. Magnuson Park in Seattle. Several props used are working medical equipment, including the MRI machine.

When asked about operating room scenes, Sarah Drew said:

Costumes are used to differentiate between attending surgeons, who wear navy blue scrubs, and residents, who wear light blue scrubs. The series is filmed with a single-camera setup, as are many dramas. Grey's Anatomy is often filmed using the "walk-and-talk" filming technique, popularized on television by series such as St. Elsewhere, ER, and The West Wing.

Broadcast history

Grey's Anatomy first season commenced airing as a mid-season replacement to Boston Legal on March 27, 2005, and concluded on May 22, 2005. The 9-episode season aired on Sundays in the 10:00pm EST time slot, following Desperate Housewives. The show was renewed by ABC for a second season, that aired in the same time slot as season 1. Premiering on September 25, 2005, and concluding on May 15, 2006, the season consisted of 27 episodes. As the original first season order was for 13 episodes, 5 episodes were held for season 2, as ABC   decided to close the first season of Grey's Anatomy on the same night as Desperate Housewives finale. During season 2, Grey's Anatomy produced 2 specials recapping the events of recent episodes, narrated by Bailey, entitled "Straight to the Heart" and "Under Pressure". The show was renewed for a third season, which was relocated to the coveted Thursday 9:00 pm EST time slot. The show has remained on Thursdays since then. Commencing on September 21, 2006, and ending on May 17, 2007, season 3 consisted of 25 episodes. 2 more specials were produced during the show's third season, entitled "Complications of the Heart" and "Every Moment Counts", which were narrated by Bailey and Morgan, respectively.

ABC renewed Grey's Anatomy for a fourth season, which aired from September 27, 2007, to May 22, 2008, and ultimately consisted of 17 episodes. Season 4 had a reduced number of episodes, due to the 2007–08 Writers Guild of America strike, which caused production to cease from February to April, leaving the show with no writing staff during that time. At the beginning of season 4, the show aired its final special entitled "Come Rain Or Shine", created to transition viewers from Grey's Anatomy to Private Practice, which was narrated by the editors of People magazine. The show received a renewal for a fifth season, which premiered on September 25, 2008, and concluded on May 14, 2009, consisting of 24 episodes. The series was renewed for a sixth season consisting of 24 episodes, which commenced on September 24, 2009, and ended on May 20, 2010. During season 6, Grey's Anatomy aired a series of webisodes entitled Seattle Grace: On Call at ABC.com. ABC renewed the show for a seventh season, which premiered on September 23, 2010, and concluded on May 19, 2011, consisting of 22 episodes. This was followed up with Seattle Grace: On Call, Seattle Grace: Message of Hope, aired during the beginning of season 7. Also during season 7, the series produced a musical episode entitled "Song Beneath the Song", featuring songs that became famous through their use in Grey's Anatomy. The show received a 24-episode eighth season renewal, which commenced on September 22, 2011, with a 2-hour episode, and ended on May 17, 2012. Grey's Anatomy was renewed for a ninth season, which premiered on September 27, 2012, and ended on May 16, 2013. Grey's Anatomy was renewed for a tenth season on May 10, 2013 and premiered on September 27, 2013, with a 2-hour episode, and ended on May 15, 2014.

On May 8, 2014, ABC renewed the series for an 11th season that aired from September 25, 2014, to May 14, 2015. In addition, the show was relocated to the Thursday 8:00 pm EST time slot. After four seasons outside the Top 25 rated shows, Grey's Anatomy was the No. 15 show in the 2013–2014 season, the show's tenth. The show also re-entered the Top 5 shows in the 18–49 viewer demographic. On May 7, 2015, ABC renewed the series for a 12th season that premiered on September 24, 2015, and concluded on May 19, 2016. The 13th season aired from September 22, 2016, to May 18, 2017. The 14th season aired from September 28, 2017, to May 17, 2018. The 15th season aired from September 27, 2018, to May 16, 2019. The 16th season aired from September 26, 2019, to April 9, 2020. The 17th season aired from November 12, 2020, to June 3, 2021. On May 10, 2021, the series was renewed for an 18th season, which premiered on September 30, 2021. On January 10, 2022, the series was renewed for a 19th season, which premiered on October 6, 2022.

Distribution
Grey's Anatomy episodes appear regularly on ABC in the United States. All episodes are approximately 43 minutes and broadcast in both high-definition and standard. The series' episodes are also available for download at the iTunes Store in standard and high-definition qualities, and Amazon Video. ABC Video-On-Demand also releases recent episodes of the show for temporary viewing. Recent episodes are also available at ABC's official Grey's Anatomy website, and on Hulu and Xfinity. In 2009, ABC signed a deal allowing Grey's Anatomy episodes to be streamed on Netflix. Grey's Anatomy is syndicated on Lifetime, with one hour blocks weekdays at 1:00 pm, 2:00 pm, and 3:00 pm EST.In some territories, including the United Kingdom, the full show is available on Disney+.

Home media releases

Since its debut, Buena Vista Home Entertainment has released the first 13 seasons on DVD to regions 1, 2, and 4. The season 1 DVD, released on February 14, 2006, features an alternate title sequence, bloopers, behind-the-scenes footage, audio commentaries, and an extended edition of the pilot episode. The season 2 DVD, released on September 12, 2006, which includes extended episodes, an interview with Wilson, deleted scenes, a set tour, a "Q&A" with the cast, and a segment on the special effects creation. The season 3 DVD was released on September 11, 2007, with bonus features including extended episodes, an interview with star Dempsey, audio commentaries, and bloopers.

The season 4 DVD released on September 9, 2008, features an interview with Heigl and Chambers, extended episodes, bloopers, and deleted scenes. The season 5 DVD was released on September 15, 2009, and includes unaired scenes, bloopers, and extended episodes. The season 6 DVD, released on September 14, 2010, features deleted scenes, an extended finale, and bloopers. The season 7 DVD, released on September 13, 2011, includes an extended edition of and a behind-the-scenes featurette on the musical episode, bloopers, as well as deleted scenes. In addition, the season 8 DVD was released on September 4, 2012, with several bonus features and deleted scenes.

The season 9 DVD released on August 27, 2013, with several bonus features and deleted scenes. The season 10 DVD was released on September 2, 2014, with new several bonus features and deleted scenes. The season was officially released on DVD as a 6-disc box-set under the title of Grey's Anatomy: The Complete Tenth Season – Live For The Moments on September 2, 2014. In view of the departure of the character of Cristina Yang in the season finale, the DVD set featured an extended episode Do You Know? and a special feature from Sandra Oh titled "An Immeasurable Gift". Season 11 released on DVD as a 6-disc box set on August 18, 2015, with interviews with new series regular Caterina Scorsone and a special feature for Dempsey's departure, titled "How To Say Goodbye Dr. Derek Shepherd". Season 12 released on DVD as a 6-disc box set on August 30, 2016. Season 13 released on DVD as a 6-disc box set on August 29, 2017.

DVD releases

Reception

Critical response

Grey's Anatomy has been well received among critics. The show holds an average score of 83% on Rotten Tomatoes. Emily VanDerWerff of The A.V. Club gave an insight on the series' overwhelming success and the lows, writing that the quality arc is "all over the place". She noted the steady build-up in the first season; the series skyrocketing into a phenomenon in the second season; the gradual dip in season three; and "some seriously bumpy moments" in the fourth and the fifth season, which was interrupted by the writers' strike. VanDerWerff felt that the "climb begins again in season six". Samantha Highfill of Entertainment Weekly in a review wrote, "I believe the show's best season to date is season 2. Let me make it clear that I'm not saying seasons 3 through 9 were bad. In my opinion, there have only been a few lulls in the show's history, and most of them didn't last a full season." adding, "I still enjoy the show, and I'll honestly never stop watching. By any standards, Grey's Anatomy has been successful television, ranking highly in the ratings for nine seasons and entering the cultural lexicon via phrases as cloying yet catchy as 'McDreamy', the show has had its periods of being intensely irritating, and it has had its periods when it seems as if Shonda Rhimes has taken leave of her faculties, but it's also got an amazingly high batting average, particularly with every solid season that passes along in this second act of its run." The site lauded the show saying, "On average, it's been very good TV, filled with interesting, driven characters who run the gamut of professions within the show's hospital setting. It's been, by turns, a good soap, a good romantic comedy, a good medical drama, and a good interpersonal show about an unexpected workplace family."

The first season received positive reviews which steadily built up, with Gary Levin of USA Today calling Grey's Anatomy one of the top shows on television. The New York Daily News named Grey's Anatomy a "winner", whereas Newsday expressed a positive opinion by stating "You simply can't stop watching." The Washington Post Tom Shales was critical of season one, finding it reminiscent of ER and commenting that: "The show is much more a matter of commercial calculation than an honest attempt to try something fresh and different." Shortly after its initial airing, the Chicago Tribune Maureen Ryan called Grey's Anatomy the new Friends (a concluded National Broadcasting Company (NBC) sitcom following the lives of a group of young adults, that for all of its 10-year run was in the top-5 for viewer ratings). The second season received high critical acclaim: top critics like Emily VanDerWerff of The A.V. Club called the show a "phenomenon", adding the show was, "one of the best TV shows around", while Samantha Highfill of Entertainment Weekly later during the tenth season called the second "the show's best season to date". However, Kevin Carr of 7M Pictures opined that Grey's Anatomy is a mere combination of Scrubs, ER, Sex and the City and The Love Boat. It further garnered positive reviews: Christopher Monfette of IGN added "The second season of this medical drama expertly wove its signature elements of complex relationships, whimsical banter and challenging life-lessons; all to a montage-fetish, indie-rock soundtrack." Todd Gilchrist, also from IGN, called the season "terrific" adding, "Indeed, one of the best currently on television. While it remains to be seen what the creators do with it, now that it's become an outright event program, the season demonstrates that Rhimes and co. know what to do with the opportunities presented them. whether you're male or female, this is the kind of entertainment that small-screen devotees and folks fed up with television need to see."

The title character of Grey's Anatomy, Meredith, has received both overwhelmingly positive and weary feedback by critics along the course of the show, with the development of the character garnering praise from majority critics. Earlier reactions for Meredith were mixed; in a 2006 review, Alessandra Stanley of The New York Times dubbed to her as "the heroine of Grey's Anatomy". A reviewer for BuddyTV praised the distinct uniqueness in the character calling Meredith an "unconventional heroine" adding that the character was, "Neither black nor white but always ... wait for it ... many shades of grey. The reviewer and to add that even in her lighter moments, she has still been "dark and twisty." The sentiment was shared by Glenn Diaz who remarked, "You gotta love Mer when she's gloomy." When Pompeo did not receive a nomination 61st Primetime Emmy Awards, for her work as Meredith. Mary McNamara of the Los Angeles Times suggested that Pompeo, "has worked very hard ... to make Meredith Grey an interesting character", and should have received a nomination. IGN Monfette, less impressed by the character, criticized her storyline as "some bizarrely under-developed sub-plot about depression and giving Derek a season's worth of reconsidering to do." Robert Rorke of the New York Post was critical of Meredith's relationship with Derek Shepherd, writing: "She used to be the queen of the romantic dilemmas, but lately, she's been a little dopey, what with the endless 'McDreamy' soliloquies." The development of the character has received praise from critics. Reviewing the first part of the eighth season, TV Fanatic wrote: "this season belongs to Meredith Grey. She is the heart and soul of the show and has been outstanding. This is a character that used to be so dark and twisty and has now grown into a more mature woman. Ellen Pompeo has been at the top of her game this season." Rick Porter reviewing the episode "How to Save a Life" from the 11th season for Zap2it wrote, "Without Meredith, and without one of Pompeo's strongest performances in her long time on the show, "How to Save a Life" would have run the risk of coming across as a baldly manipulative death episode, the likes of which the show has done several times before. He added How to Save a Life" may not be the ideal Emmy-submission episode for Ellen Pompeo, considering Meredith is off screen for more than half of it. But it's among the best work she's ever done on the show." Janalen Samson of BuddyTV lauded the Meredith's development throughout the series saying, "When one considers how this character has grown over eleven seasons, it really is amazing. Kudos to Ellen Pompeo for her fine work. She's actually done the impossible, because I actually care what happens to Meredith Grey." Reviewing the season 12 premiere, "Sledgehammer", critics including Alex Hawkins of the Western Gazette again highlighted Pompeo's being due for an Emmy Award.

The majority of the supporting cast of Grey's Anatomy have been well received as well, with the New York Post Rorke deeming Stevens to be "the heart-and-soul" of Grey's Anatomy, whereas Eyder Peralta of the Houston Chronicle was critical of her character development, stating: "[She's] the reason I don't watch Grey's Anatomy anymore." Kelli Catana of The Huffington Post named Yang "the best damn character" and deemed "the Meredith/Yang relationship the most true friendship on network television." Television Without Pity writer Lauren Shotwell claimed Yang is "the only one of these five [residents] that regularly acts like an actual doctor". Analyzing Alex Karev, Rachel Simon called him "underrated", and she pointed out that his personal growth never seems to get acknowledged, as "Alex has evolved, slowly and realistically, into a genuinely good person whose faults don't miraculously disappear, but take a backseat to much better qualities." Robert Bianco of USA Today said Dempsey has a "seemingly effortless way of humanizing Derek's 'dreamy' appeal with ego and vanity". His friendship with Mark Sloan has been well received. Victor Balta said "they've demonstrated an easy chemistry that makes for some of the great comic relief around Seattle Grace Hospital." Addison Montgomery was deemed "sassy and bright and interesting." TV Guide said of Walsh's stint on Grey's Anatomy that she "adds spice to an already hot show." Callie Torres, after having previously received mixed reviews, was praised for her bisexual storyline. Critics added that the character was anchored by stellar performances by Sara Ramirez. Lexie Grey, having initially been criticized, became a critics' favorite in the series. Alex Keen of The Trades wrote that Lexie's "presence and confidence have increased quite a bit ... and actress, Chyler Leigh, does a fantastic job of making this progression feel seamless. Since the series has defused the tension between Little Grey and Big Grey (aka Meredith), Lexie has clear sailing through the season and steals the show as one of the best current characters on the series."

With the departure of several cast members throughout the seasons, many new characters have been added to the drama's ensemble. McKidd and Capshaw were referred to as "fresh additions" to the series, by Monfette of IGN. Matt Roush of TV Guide commented: "Hunt is the most encouraging thing to happen to Grey's Anatomy in quite a while." Matt Mitovich of TV Guide noted that Robbins "quickly established herself as a fan favorite", describing her as "a breath of fresh air in the often-angsty halls of Seattle Grace. On April Kepner and Jackson Avery, Courtney Morrison of TVFanatic wrote, "April has grown since her character was introduced ... she's honest. A girl with principles is a girl you want to do well." He described her and Avery as "a couple for whom viewers can root". Speaking of the new cast members, in addition to the remaining original ones, Robert Bianco from USA Today called them the show's "best ensemble in years".

Regarding season three, Bill Carter of The New York Times called Grey's Anatomy "television's hottest show", adding: "[No show] is expected to challenge Grey's Anatomy for prime-time pre-eminence." Contrasting with Carter's view, Monfette of IGN said that it speedily found itself "mired in the annoying and absurd", adding: "This third season may very well represent a case of over-writing a concept that has, perhaps tragically, run bone-dry on narrative fuel." At the conclusion of season three, Entertainment Weekly Gregory Kirschling said "the show lacked a defining happy, warm-gooseflesh moment", adding that the season "didn't leave you dying for the [next] season premiere". Speaking of the fourth season, Laura Burrows of IGN said the series became "a little more than mediocre, but less than fantastic", adding: "This season proved that even strong chemistry and good acting cannot save a show that suffers from the inevitable recycled plot."

In contrast to the moderately negative feedback the third and fourth seasons received, Alan Sepinwall of The Star-Ledger said of the fifth season: "Overall, it feels more like the good old days than Grey's Anatomy has in a long time." Misha Davenport from the Chicago Sun-Times said season five "hits on all the things the show does so well", adding: "There is romance, heartbreak, humor and a few moments that will move fans to tears." Brian Lowry of Variety, less impressed, opinionated that the season five displayed the show running out of storylines. Speaking of the sixth season, Bianco of USA Today wrote: "Grey's has always loved grand gestures. You like them or you don't; the only real question is whether the show pulls them off or it doesn't. This year, it did."

The series has a score of 66 out of 100 on Metacritic, based on five reviews for season seven. In response to the season, Bianco from USA Today commented: "Happily, it now seems to have landed on solid ground." Also of the seventh season, Entertainment Weeklys Jennifer Armstrong said: "It's in the shooting's emotional reverberations that the show is regenerating after the past few hit-and-miss seasons," whereas Verne Gay of Newsday commented: "Unfortunately, they've settled on far-too-easy and facile answers for the most part." HitFix gave a positive review saying that, "season seven overall has been one of the show's strongest ever." and added, "There was a time when Grey's Anatomy was this show where I suffered through a lot of stuff that made me cringe to get to those genius melodrama moments it could do so well. Over the last couple of years, it's evolved into a show that's much more consistent in tone, where it may not move me as often as it did in the early years but also very rarely makes me question my reasons for watching." Speaking of season eight, Entertainment Weekly Mandi Bierly called it a "so-so season", and Lesley Goldberg of The Hollywood Reporter called it "emotional". Also acknowledging the fan base, Verne Gay of Newsday wrote "Grey's has had a good season and has an intensely loyal fan base to prove it." regarding the eighth season.

The ninth season received more positive reviews, Rob Salem of Toronto Star called it "a solid return to form." Praising the friendship between Meredith and Cristina of Entertainment Weekly wrote, "There's still one good reason to keep watching: Where else can you find such deep friendships between female co-workers". The tenth season was also marked with praise, Annie Barrett for Entertainment Weekly wrote "There's true sorrow here along with the passion, which keeps their dynamic so intriguing to me." Caroline Siede from The A.V. Club wrote in her review for the tenth season "At its best, Grey's Anatomy is about everyday bravery, sacrifice, and courage. At its worst, it's a melodramatic, moralizing soap opera. Both sides are on display as the show heads confidently into its 10th season." Many sources, including Rachel Simon of Bustle and Nicole Pomarico of Wetpaint, claimed that Sandra Oh's performance during her final season on Grey's Anatomy is worthy of an Emmy nomination.

Bryce Olin of Netflix ranked Grey's 9th among the 50 Best TV Shows on Netflix stating, "It's a tough call, but based on Grey's casting choices and revolutionary portrayals of female doctors in the series, I'm willing to argue that Grey's Anatomy is the best medical drama of all time. Obviously, Shonda Rhimes didn't reinvent the wheel with the series, but there's no denying its popularity." adding, "I understand its significance in the pop culture sphere." He also stated that the show could go higher in the ranks with the upcoming season stating, "Apparently, Grey's Anatomy fans are passionate about their show, although it seems like they've been closeted for the last few years. I'd love to move Grey's Anatomy even higher on the ranking, but I'll have wait until the eleventh season comes to Netflix."

The show was criticized for its handling of a controversy: The Grey's Anatomy scandal revolved around actor Isaiah Washington using a homophobic slur on set. Mainstream media coverage scapegoated this scandal as “black masculinity for perpetrating homophobia, thus containing both sexual and racial difference in the name of tolerance.”

Critics' top 10 lists
Critics included Grey's Anatomy in top ten lists for five of its 14 seasons; these are listed below in order of rank.

Impact

Grey Anatomy has been considered an impact on culture by Entertainment Weekly executive editor, Lori Majewski, with her writing: "Grey's Anatomy isn't just a show, it's a phenomenon. When [the] final shows air, every place in New York City is empty. You could get a table at the best restaurants." The Daily Beast Jace Lacob also considered the show an impact, comparing its success to that of Friends, and calling it a "cultural phenomenon". Steve Sternberg, a media analyst with Magna Global USA explained that the show appeals to a broad audience, writing: "Roughly 80 percent of households during prime time only have one TV set on. People are looking for shows they can watch with other household members." In its initial seasons, Grey's Anatomy introduced a "Mc-labeling" surge, which started when various characters dubbed Dempsey's character "McDreamy". Canadian newspaper the National Post considers this trend a "phenomenon". Analyzing the show's impact on culture, Dessylyn Arnold of Yahoo! Voices noted that the "Mc-labeling" trend has been parodied on other shows including ER and Degrassi: The Next Generation. Mark Lawson of The Guardian has credited Grey's Anatomy with popularizing the "songtage", or musical montage segments. Parodying this, MADtv spoofed the show in 2006, making fun of the series' emotional scenes including those accompanied by a musical montage.

Grey's Anatomy has also been credited to helping redefine "good" television; The A.V. Club writes, "Since The Sopranos burst onto the scene, we've too often classified a show as "good" based on how closely it adhered to the dark, violent, male-centric template set out by that particular show. It's time for that to end. At its best, Grey's Anatomy has been among the very best shows on TV, and at its worst, it's been at least fascinating to watch. To write it off is to unnecessarily narrow the definition of what good TV can be, to limit what the medium is capable of. TV is at its best when it emotionally connects, and even when it seems to be otherwise merrily hurtling off a cliff, Grey's Anatomy is nothing but emotional connection, which is more than other, more consistently better shows can say." The series placed at No. 66 on Entertainment Weekly "New TV Classics" list in 2007, and was declared the third-highest rated show for the first ten years of the IMDb (2002–2012). The show's premise has inspired the creation of A Corazón Abierto, a Colombian adaptation of Grey's Anatomy, which in turn spawned a Mexican version of the same name.

An additional study conducted by Brian Quick of the University of Illinois indicated that the show's portrayal of doctors being "smart, good looking, capable, and interesting", leads viewers to associating real-world doctors to be that way. Surgical resident Karen Zink, M.D., deemed the show's portrayal of interns inaccurate, adding: "None of [the characters] have bags under their eyes. They all leave the hospital dressed cute, with their hair done and makeup on. That is so far away from the reality of interns. You are just dragging your butt, trying to stay alive. You don't have time to do your hair. You don't have time to put on makeup. Every surgical intern has bags under their eyes."

In 2011, a woman residing in Sheboygan, Wisconsin became unresponsive due to an asthma attack. Unable to wait for an ambulance, her daughter and a friend performed cardiopulmonary resuscitation (CPR) on her, which they learned from Grey's Anatomy. In 2017, an Israeli woman saved her husband by performing cardiac massage she learned from Grey's Anatomy, The woman performed cardiac massage for 20 minutes before medical personal arrived and transferred the husband to Shaare Zedek Medical Center. The mid-season premiere of the 14th season was entitled "1-800-799-7233", the National Domestic Violence Hotline; upon release on January 18, 2018, the move was received favorably and viewers variously changed their Twitter usernames to the same and used the platform to bring awareness to both the hotline and the issue of domestic abuse.

U.S. television ratings
Greys Anatomy has received high viewership and ratings since its debut. The first 4 seasons of the program each ranked in the top 10 among all viewers, reaching its peak Nielsen ratings in the second season, attracting an average of 19.44 million viewers per episode, and ranking at No. 5 overall. Following the show's time-slot being relocated, overall rankings steadily declined, dropping below the top 10 in its fifth season. Grey's Anatomy made its greatest fall from its sixth to seventh season, slipping from #16 to No. 31. The series is on a steady decline in terms of overall viewership and rankings, yet Grey's Anatomy still holds value in charts when numbers are pulled from the digital video recorder (DVR). It was the most recorded show between 2007 and 2011, based on cumulative totals, and has been for several years in a row.

The most-watched episode of the series is "It's the End of the World", with 37.88 million viewers, aided by a lead-in from Super Bowl XL. Grey's Anatomy was the most expensive program on television in the 2007–08 season measured by advertising revenue, with earnings of US$400,000 per 30 seconds. The show was named the fourth (behind Desperate Housewives, Two and a Half Men, and American Idol), and the fifth-highest (behind Glee, Two and a Half Men, The X Factor and American Idol) revenue-earning show, with the earnings of US$2.67 million and US$2.75 million per half hour in 2011 and 2012 respectively. While Grey's Anatomy is no longer ranked in the top numbers for overall ratings, the show's ranking in the key 18–49 demographic has remained high. As of season 8, the series is the highest-rated drama on television in the target demographic. In 2016, a New York Times study of the 50 TV shows with the most Facebook Likes found that Grey's Anatomy was "most popular in a swath of the middle of the country, particularly in areas with a lower percentage of college graduates".

Below is a table of Grey's Anatomys seasonal rankings in the U.S. television market, based on average total viewers per episode. Each U.S. network television season starts in September and ends in late May, which coincides with the completion of May sweeps.

Accolades

Grey's Anatomy has received numerous awards and nominations. The show has been nominated for 39 Primetime Emmy Awards, having been nominated for at least one every year until 2013. At the 57th Primetime Emmy Awards in 2005, Oh was nominated for Outstanding Supporting Actress in a Drama Series, which she went on to be nominated for every year until 2009, and Horton was nominated for Outstanding Directing for a Drama Series. The following year, at the 58th Primetime Emmy Awards, the series received a nomination for Outstanding Drama Series, which they were nominated for again in 2007. Also in 2006, Wilson was nominated for Outstanding Supporting Actress in a Drama Series, which she went on to be nominated for every year until 2009, and Kyle Chandler was nominated for Outstanding Guest Actor in a Drama Series. The 58th ceremony also honored Rhimes and Vernoff, who were both nominated for Outstanding Writing for a Drama Series. Rhimes, whose career kicked off in 1995, has since produced yet another ABC series, Scandal, which began on air in 2012 and ended in 2019. Beginning in 2005, Rhimes has been continually nominated for numerous awards, including 3 Emmy Awards: first in 2006 for a dramatic series and a separate nomination for writing a dramatic series, followed by a third nomination in 2007 for a dramatic series.

In 2007, at the 59th Primetime Emmy Awards, Heigl won the award for Outstanding Supporting Actress in a Drama Series, while Knight was nominated for Outstanding Supporting Actor in a Drama Series. Numerous guest actresses have been nominated for Outstanding Guest Actress in a Drama Series, including Burton in 2006 and 2007, Christina Ricci in 2006, Reaser in 2007, Diahann Carroll in 2008, and Sharon Lawrence in 2009, but the only actress to have won the award is Devine in 2011, who was nominated again in 2012. The show has also been nominated for 13 Creative Arts Emmy Awards, having won 3 of them: Outstanding Casting for a Drama Series, Outstanding Makeup for a Single-Camera Series (Non-Prosthetic), and Outstanding Prosthetic Makeup for a Series, Miniseries, Movie or a Special.

The show has received 10 Golden Globe Award nominations since its premiere. At the 63rd Golden Globe Awards, in 2006, the series was nominated for Best Drama Series, Dempsey was nominated for Best Actor in a Drama Series, which he was nominated for again in 2007, and Oh won the award for Best Supporting Actress in a Series, Miniseries, or Television Film. The following year, at the 64th Golden Globe Awards, in 2007, Pompeo was nominated for Best Actress in a Drama Series, and the show won Best Drama Series. At the 65th Golden Globe Awards, in 2008, Heigl was nominated for Best Supporting Actress in a Series, Miniseries, or Television Film, while the series in whole was nominated for Best Drama Series.

The series has won People's Choice Awards for Best Drama 5 times in 2007, 2013, 2015, 2016 and 2017 and has been nominated for several other People's Choice Awards, with nominations received by Oh as well as multiple wins from Dempsey, Pompeo winning in recent years 2013 and 2015, Heigl, Wilson, Demi Lovato, for guest starring, and the drama in whole for Favorite TV Drama. In 2007, Rhimes and the female cast were the recipient of the Women in Film Lucy Award, in recognition of the excellence and innovation in the show as a creative work that has enhanced the perception of women through the medium of television. The series has been honored with numerous NAACP Image Award nominations, many having been won, including 5 awards for Outstanding Drama Series. Grey's Anatomy has also received several Screen Actors Guild Awards, with nominations received by Dempsey, as well as wins from Oh, Wilson, and the main cast for Outstanding Performance by an Ensemble in a Drama Series.

Spin-offs and adaptations 

Grey's Anatomy has spawned several spin-offs and adaptations.

Private Practice

On February 21, 2007, The Wall Street Journal reported that ABC was pursuing a spin-off medical drama television series for Grey's Anatomy featuring Walsh's character, Addison Montgomery. Subsequent reports confirmed the decision, stating that an expanded two-hour broadcast of Grey's Anatomy would serve as a backdoor pilot for the proposed spin-off. The cast of Grey's Anatomy was reportedly unhappy about the decision, as all hoped the spin-off would have been given to them. Pompeo commented that she felt, as the star, she should have been consulted, and Heigl disclosed that she had hoped for a spin-off for Stevens. The backdoor pilot that aired on May 3, 2007, sees Montgomery take a leave of absence from Seattle Grace Hospital, to visit her best-friend from Los Angeles, Naomi Bennett (Merrin Dungey, later Audra McDonald), a reproductive endocrinology and infertility specialist. While in Los Angeles, she meets Bennett's colleagues at the Oceanside Wellness Center. The two-hour broadcast entitled "The Other Side of This Life" served as the twenty-second and twenty-third episodes of the third season, and was directed by Michael Grossman, according to Variety. The cast included Amy Brenneman, Paul Adelstein, Tim Daly, Taye Diggs, Chris Lowell, and Merrin Dungey.

KaDee Strickland's character, Charlotte King, who would be introduced in the spin-off's first-season premiere, did not appear in the backdoor pilot. Her addition to the main cast was announced on July 11, 2007, prior to the commencement of the first season. She did not have to audition for the role, but was cast after a meeting with Rhimes. Also not present in the backdoor pilot was McDonald, due to her character, Naomi Bennett, being portrayed by a different actress, Merrin Dungey. However, on June 29, 2007, ABC announced that Dungey would be replaced, with no reason given for the change. The drama was titled Private Practice, and its premiere episode followed the second part of the season debut of Dancing with the Stars, and provided a lead-in to fellow freshman series Dirty Sexy Money. Pushing Daisies, a third new series for the evening, rounded out the lineup as a lead-in to Private Practice. The series ended its run on January 22, 2013, after 6 seasons.

Station 19

On May 16, 2017, Channing Dungey announced at the ABC Upfronts that the network ordered another Grey's Anatomy spin-off, this one focusing on firefighters in Seattle. The series premiered mid-season in 2018. Stacy McKee, long-term Grey's writer and executive producer, serves as the spin-off's showrunner. The new show was introduced Season 14, Episode 13, when a house fire brings the firefighters to Grey Sloan Memorial Hospital. In July 2017, it was announced that Jaina Lee Ortiz was the first actress cast in the spin-off series. In September 2017, it was announced that Jason George, who has played Dr. Ben Warren since season 6, would be leaving Grey's Anatomy to move to the spin-off. He continued to be a series regular on Grey's Anatomy until the spin-off began production. In October 2017, it was announced that 5 new series regulars for the spin-off had been cast being Grey Damon, Jay Hayden, Okieriete Onaodowan, Danielle Savre and Barrett Doss. It was also announced that the spin-off had a 10-episode order for the first season. Later in October 2017, it was announced that Miguel Sandoval was cast as the Captain of the firehouse.

Grey's Anatomy: B-Team
On January 9, 2018, it was announced by Sarah Drew on her Instagram page that a 6-episode spin-off series following the new interns of Grey Sloan Memorial would be released for streaming on the ABC app and abc.com on Thursday, January 11, 2018. Grey's Anatomy: B-Team stars Sophia Taylor Ali (Dahlia Qadri), Jake Borelli (Levi Schmitt), Alex Blue Davis (Casey Parker), Jaicy Elliot (Taryn Helm), Rushi Kota (Vik Roy) and Jeanine Mason (Samantha "Sam" Bello) with special guest appearances made by Justin Chambers (Alex Karev), Kelly McCreary (Maggie Pierce), Kevin McKidd (Owen Hunt) and James Pickens Jr. (Richard Webber). The 6 episodes in this series were written by Barbara Kaye Friend with Grey's Anatomy series regular Sarah Drew (April Kepner) making her directorial debut directing each of them.

Crossovers
Grey's Anatomy has several crossover storylines with both spin-offs Private Practice and Station 19 throughout its run.

International adaptations
An adaptation called Doktorlar ("Doctors") premiered on December 28, 2006, on Turkish network Show TV. It aired for 4 seasons.

In 2010, A Corazón Abierto ("An Open Heart"), an adaptation of the series, was made by the Colombian network RCN TV. It aired for 2 seasons.

In 2011, A Corazón Abierto ("An Open Heart"), an adaptation of the series, was made by the Mexican network TV Azteca. It aired for 2 seasons.

Merchandise

The American Broadcasting Company has partnered with J. Larson CafePress and Barco Uniforms to provide the series' branded merchandise through an online store. The products available include shirts, sweatshirts, kitchenware, homeware, and bags, with the Grey's Anatomy logo on it. Also available are custom unisex scrubs and lab coats in a variety of colors and sizes, designed by Barco. The merchandise released by the company is available for purchase at the Grey's Anatomy official website, and US$1 from every purchase is donated to Barco's Nightingales Foundation.

Five volumes of the Grey's Anatomy Original Soundtrack have been released . For the first 2 seasons, the show's main title theme was an excerpt from "Cosy in the Rocket", by British duo Psapp; it is featured on the first soundtrack album released via ABC's corporate cousin, Hollywood Records, on September 27, 2005. The second soundtrack, featuring songs from the series' second season, was released on September 12, 2006, followed by a third soundtrack with music from the third season. Following the seventh season musical episode "Song Beneath the Song", "Grey's Anatomy: The Music Event" soundtrack was released, with volume 4 of the soundtrack released subsequently.

In January 2009, Ubisoft announced that it had signed a licensing agreement with ABC Studios to develop a video game based on Grey's Anatomy. Designed for the Wii, Nintendo DS and PC, Grey's Anatomy: The Video Game was released on March 10, 2009. The game lets the player assume the role of one of the main characters, making decisions for the character's personal and professional life, and competing in a number of minigames. It has been criticized by reviewers because of the simplicity of the mini-games and voice actors who do not play the same characters on the series, with Jason Ocampo of IGN giving it a 6/10 overall rating. The Wii release received mixed reviews, and the Windows release received generally unfavorable reviews.

ABC and Nielsen partnered in 2011 to create a Grey Anatomy application for Apple's iPad. The application was designed to allow viewers to participate in polls and learn trivial facts as they watch a live episode. It uses Nielsen's Media-Sync software to listen for the episode and to post features as the episode progresses.

The creators of the show set up a real online wedding registry to mark the wedding of Meredith Grey and Derek Shepherd. Instead of buying gifts fans were encouraged to donate money to the American Academy of Neurology Foundation.

Notes

Explanatory footnotes 

 Pompeo starred as the leading role in Moonlight Mile, which explains the significance of her being cast as Meredith.
 The character of O'Malley failed his intern test, which is why he was not initially a resident along with Meredith, Yang, Stevens and Karev.
 Meredith and Shepherd had decided to adopt, due to Meredith's infertility, which was diagnosed in season 7.
 The Chicago Tribune list is not ranked—it consists of 10 shows in alphabetical order.
 The Grey's Anatomy logo can be seen in the infobox, above.

References

Further reading

External links

  at ABC.com
 
 

 
2000s American LGBT-related drama television series
2000s American medical television series
2000s American romance television series
2000s American workplace drama television series
2000s romantic drama television series
2005 American television series debuts
2010s American LGBT-related drama television series
2010s American medical television series
2010s American romance television series
2010s American workplace drama television series
2010s romantic drama television series
2020s American LGBT-related drama television series
2020s American medical television series
2020s American romance television series
2020s American workplace drama television series
2020s romantic drama television series
American Broadcasting Company original programming
American romantic drama television series
American television soap operas
Best Drama Series Golden Globe winners
English-language television shows
Gay-related television shows
Lesbian-related television shows
Outstanding Performance by an Ensemble in a Drama Series Screen Actors Guild Award winners
Primetime Emmy Award-winning television series
Serial drama television series
Television franchises
Television series by ABC Studios
Television series by Entertainment One
Television series by Shondaland
Television series created by Shonda Rhimes
Television shows adapted into video games
Television shows filmed in Los Angeles
Television shows set in Seattle